George Paxton Young (9 Nov 1818 - 26 Feb 1889) was a Canadian philosopher and professor of logic, metaphysics and ethics at the University of Toronto. He studied the quintic polynomial equation and in 1888 described how to solve a solvable quintic equation, without providing an explicit formula.

George Paxton Young Memorial Prize
The Department of Philosophy at the University of Toronto grants the George Paxton Young Memorial Prize annually to students who read a refereed philosophy paper at an international, national or regional philosophy conference.

References

Philosophy academics
Academic staff of the University of Toronto
Political philosophers
Kant scholars
1818 births
1889 deaths